Al Sayegh Airlines is an airline based in the United Arab Emirates. Its main base is Sharjah International Airport.

Fleet
The Al Sayegh Airlines fleet includes the following aircraft:

External links

References

Airlines of the United Arab Emirates
Airlines established in 2008